A Night in the Life of Jimmy Reardon, also known as Aren't You Even Gonna Kiss Me Goodbye?, is a 1988 American coming of age drama film written and directed by William Richert and starring River Phoenix, Ann Magnuson, Meredith Salenger, Matthew Perry, Ione Skye, and Louanne. It is based upon Richert's 1966 novel Aren't You Even Gonna Kiss Me Goodbye?. The story centers on a high school graduate who must decide if he wants to go to business school at the request of his father, or go his own way and find a full-time job, while also deciding on who he wants to be in life and if he should leave his house.

A Night in the Life of Jimmy Reardon was filmed in 1986 and released in early 1988. The released film deviates considerably from the original director's cut, which is now available under the title Aren't You Even Gonna Kiss Me Goodbye?.

Plot summary 
In a wealthy Chicago suburb during the early 1960s, middle-class Jimmy Reardon hangs out with his upper-class best friend, Fred Roberts, and sleeps with Fred's snobby girlfriend, Denise Hunter. He spends his time writing poetry and drinking coffee while he decides what to do after high school. His parents won't help him pay for tuition unless he attends the same business college as his father did, but Jimmy doesn't want to follow that path. Instead, he focuses on coming up with enough money for a plane ticket to go to Hawaii with his wealthy yet chaste girlfriend, Lisa Bentwright. On the night of a big party, Jimmy is given the task of driving home his mother's divorced friend, Joyce Fickett, who conveniently seduces him. Since he is late picking up Lisa, she goes to the dance with the rich Matthew Hollander, instead. Jimmy crashes the family car and then shares a rapprochement with his father.

Cast 
 River Phoenix as Jimmy Reardon
 Ann Magnuson as Joyce Fickett
 Meredith Salenger as Lisa Bentwright
 Ione Skye as Denise Hunter
 Louanne Sirota as Suzie Middleberg
 Matthew Perry as Fred Roberts
 Paul Koslo as Al Reardon
 Jane Hallaren as Faye Reardon
 Jason Court as Mathew Hollander
 James Deuter as Mr. Spaulding
 Marji Banks as Emma Spaulding
 Margaret Moore as Mrs. Bentwright
 Anastasia Fielding as Elaine
 Kamie Harper as Rosie Reardon
 Johnny Galecki as Toby Reardon
 Alan Goldsher as Musician #2

Release 
On August 19, 1987, 20th Century Fox had acquired domestic theatrical distribution rights of the film from production company Island Pictures, with plans for a broad release early next year, and the possibility of other titles following in the future, which was originally granted to Island an August 28, 1987 date, but the screenings were cancelled, and the film caught the attention of Fox executives, whose production company Island Pictures already had done a video agreement with CBS/Fox Video to handle home video domestic distribution rights to its titles.

Reception

The film barely broke even at the box office, grossing a little over $6.2 million dollars against a $5 million dollar budget.

On Rotten Tomatoes the film has a 33% rating based on 6 reviews. Time Out magazine wrote: "While the film has the charm of rose-tinted retrospect and is often very funny, the pacing is wrong (it seems much longer than it is) and the sex scenes fail to convince." TV Guide stated that the film has been "Unjustly ignored by the vast majority of the critics and public".

References

External links 
 
 
 

1988 films
1988 drama films
1980s American films
1980s coming-of-age drama films
1980s English-language films
20th Century Fox films
American coming-of-age drama films
Films based on American novels
Films directed by William Richert
Films scored by Bill Conti
Films set in the 1960s
Films set in Chicago